Elections were held in the Ilocos Region for seats in the House of Representatives of the Philippines on May 10, 2010.

The candidate with the most votes won that district's seat for the 15th Congress of the Philippines.

Summary

Ilocos Norte

In Ilocos Norte, the Marcoses had a split within their ranks, former first lady Imelda Marcos and her children Bongbong and Imee Marcos had allied themselves with Nacionalista Party and then-Senator Manny Villar. Imelda's nephew Michael Marcos Keon would only support Bongbong's campaign for senator as part of the Nacionalista's roster but not Villar; Marcos Keon is a member of Lakas-Kampi-CMD and supports Gilbert Teodoro. The Marcoses also had a reconciliation with the Fariñases and invited Rodolfo Fariñas as a congressional candidate for the Nacionalistas in the province's first district.

1st District
Incumbent Roque Ablan, Jr. (Lakas-Kampi-CMD) is on his third consecutive term and can not run for reelection. His seat will be contested by his son Kristian and former congressman Rodolfo Fariñas.

The result of the election is under protest in the House of Representatives Electoral Tribunal.

2nd District
Incumbent Bongbong Marcos will leave the House to run for a Senate seat. His mother and former first lady Imelda will run for his seat under the Kilusang Bagong Lipunan (KBL) as the younger Marcos was expelled from the party. She was challenged by Marcos supporter Mariano Nalupta. She is co-nominated by the Nacionalista Party.

Nalupta placed the result of the election under protest in the House of Representatives Electoral Tribunal.

Ilocos Sur

In Ilocos Sur the Singson clan headed by Luis Singson is expected to win majority of elective positions in the province. Luis will run as governor of the province, his son Ronald Singson will run as the province's representative from the first district, and daughter-in-law Grace Singson will run on her husband Eric Singson's seat in the second district since Eric is limited three consecutive terms. Eric and Grace's son Eric Jr. was Lakas-Kampi-CMD's nominee in the district.

1st District

Ronald Singson is the incumbent.

In March 2011, Singson resigned after being found guilty of drug possession in Hong Kong. The Commission on Elections called an election that will be held on May 28, 2011.

2nd District
Eric Singson is the incumbent, but he is in his third consecutive term already and is ineligible for reelection. His son Eric Jr. is his party's nominee for the district's seat.

La Union

La Union's two seats in the House will be contested in albeit different circumstances: in the first district, Rep. Victor Francisco Ortega, whose brother is the current Governor Manuel Ortega will contest the seat against an independent candidate James Paul Orros, who claims to be a relative of the Ortegas. In the second district, Butch Dumpit, son of defeated gubernational candidate Tomas Dumpit in 2007, will go up against Eufranio Eriguel, who reportedly has support by nine of the eleven mayors in that district. The younger Ortega and Dumpit will contest the province's governorship anew.

1st District
Victor Francisco Ortega is the incumbent. Orros eventually backed out.

2nd District
Tomas Dumpit, Jr. is the incumbent.

The result of the election is under protest in the House of Representatives Electoral Tribunal.

Pangasinan

For the first time in history, all six of Pangasinan's legislative districts will have women candidates.

1st District
Incumbent Arthur Celeste (Lakas-Kampi-CMD) is running for mayor of Alaminos. His brother Jesus is his party's nominee for the district's seat. He will face former GMA Network investigative journalist and reporter Maki Pulido running under the Pwersa ng Masang Pilipino; she is also nominated by local party Biskeg na Pangasinan.

2nd District
Incumbent Victor Agbayani is running for governor of Pangasinan. The Liberal Party nominated Arthur Caronoñgan as their candidate for the district's seat.

Former PNP Chief Leopoldo Bataoil and Former NBN-4 Business Correspondent Kim Bernardo Lokin are also nominated by local party Biskeg na Pangasinan.

The result of the election is under protest in the House of Representatives Electoral Tribunal.

3rd District
Maria Rachel Arenas is the incumbent.

4th District
Former House Speaker Jose de Venecia has served for three consecutive terms, and is thus ineligible for re-election; his wife Gina de Venecia will run for his seat in the fourth district.

5th District
Marcos Cojuangco is in his third consecutive term and is ineligible for reelection. His wife Sison mayor Kimi is his party's nominee for the district's seat.

6th District
Conrado Estrella III is in his third consecutive term and is ineligible for reelection. The NPC nominated Marilyn Primcias-Agabas as their candidate for the district's seat.

Hermogenes Esperon is also nominated by local party Biskeg na Pangasinan.

References

External links
Official website of the Commission on Elections

2010 Philippine general election
2010